The Fender Pro Reverb is a high-end guitar amplifier made by Fender. It was in production from 1965 and was discontinued in 1982. The Pro Reverb is a 40-watt tube amplifier and has a pair of  speakers; however, models later than 1976 were increased to 70 watts. Teagle and Sprung, authors of the definitive book on Fender amplifiers (Fender Amps: The First Fifty Years) described the Blackface Pro Reverb as the best amplifier ever produced likely due to its combination of the two twelve inch speakers, its high quality reverb and tremolo, and just the right amount of power to get either classic Blackface Fender cleans or natural tube breakup at reasonable volumes. They wrote, "the author recommends these amps as the best all-around amp ever made—by anyone".

The Pro Reverb is most often used by players seeking a traditional Fender clean tone, with, owing to the relative low output power, propensity for 'breakup,' or musically pleasing distortion. Many players note the quality of the tube driven spring reverb and tremolo (inaccurately referred to as "vibrato" by Fender). At a time when Fender was increasing the wattage of most of its tube amps in an attempt to provide players with cleaner tones at higher volumes, the Pro Reverb was somewhat unusual in the Fender lineup due to its relatively low power output (prized by today's players) and smaller output transformer, which gave the Pro Reverb a "dirtier" sound than most of its contemporaries. Because of this, at the time the Pro Reverb did not find the widespread popularity of amplifiers such as the Fender Twin, but in recent years it has seen a revival and has become highly sought after due to its rarity and excellent tonal characteristics.

Pro Reverbs were first sold in mid-1965. Since CBS bought out Fender in January 1965, all of them are "post-CBS" Fenders. Even so, some have "Fender Electric Instruments Co." on the front panel under the Pro Reverb Amp logo instead of the CBS era "Fender Musical Instruments."

The original Pro Reverbs are "blackface"—they have black control panels with white lettering, script logo, silver/black/white grill clothes, raised "tailed"-style Fender logo on the grill cloth and black Tolex covering. They use two 5881/6L6GC power tubes, a GZ34 tube rectifier and are rated at roughly 40 watts. They have Normal and Vibrato channels, with the latter having reverb and tremolo. A dual footswitch controls the effects. In excellent condition, with original speakers these amps were selling between $1,900 and $2,400 in 2010 (2011 Vintage Guitar Price Guide). Mint examples usually sell for more.

In 1968 Fender changed styles. The front panel was polished aluminum ("silverface") with blue block lettering and the grill cloth changed to silver with blue threads (some later Pro Reverbs were sold with a silver/orange sparkle grill cloth). The cabinet grew an inch in depth about the same in height and became more angular around the front panel. An aluminum trim strip surrounded the speaker panel for roughly one year. The circuitry stayed the same as the blackface amps until later in 1968 when CBS added their ill-received modifications; the ones considered worst of these were removed by 1969. These amps were selling in 2010 for roughly $1,200 to $1,900 (2011 Vintage Guitar Price Guide).

Around 1974 a master volume control with pull boost circuit and a modern-looking "tailless"-style logo were added and two years later a 3-band EQ, an ultra linear power amp and a solid state rectifier were introduced. The output was increased to 70 watts and in 2010 these were selling for around $1,500 to $1,900 (2011 Vintage Guitar Price Guide). Amongst collectors, the "ultra-linear" solid-state rectifier versions are often considered the least desirable of the Pro Reverbs, along with the later 1980-1981 return-to-blackface appearance versions, because they traded some of the earlier vintage sound for technologically superior reliability. The Pro Reverb was discontinued in 1982.

A single-channel '68 Custom Pro Reverb was released in 2021, featuring a 3-band EQ and a single 12-inch Celestion Neo Creamback speaker.

References

 

P